Ri Yong-sam (born August 22, 1972) is a North Korean wrestler. At the 1996 Summer Olympics he won the bronze medal in the men's Freestyle Bantamweight (52–57 kg) category.  He also competed at the 2000 Summer Olympics.
He received a gold medal at the 1998 Asian Games.

References

External links
 

1972 births
Living people
Wrestlers at the 1996 Summer Olympics
Wrestlers at the 2000 Summer Olympics
North Korean male sport wrestlers
Olympic wrestlers of North Korea
Olympic bronze medalists for North Korea
Olympic medalists in wrestling
Medalists at the 1996 Summer Olympics
Asian Games medalists in wrestling
Wrestlers at the 1998 Asian Games
Medalists at the 1998 Asian Games
Asian Games gold medalists for North Korea
20th-century North Korean people